Jorge Almaguer may refer to:

 Jorge Almaguer (American soccer) (born 2000)
 Jorge Almaguer (Mexican footballer) (born 1994)